Jordan Galtier (born 22 March 1989 in Villeneuve-d'Ascq) is a former French professional footballer and current head coach of Sub19 of AC Ajaccio (France L2).

Career 
Galtier previously played professional for FC Girondins de Bordeaux, Étoile Fréjus Saint-Raphaël, AC Arles-Avignon and Lège-Cap-Ferret. He made six appearances in Ligue 2 for Arles-Avignon between 2011 and 2013.

Personal life
Galtier was born in France and is of Romani descent.

References

Jordan Galtier profile at foot-national.com

1989 births
Living people
People from Villeneuve-d'Ascq
French footballers
Association football midfielders
FC Girondins de Bordeaux players
ÉFC Fréjus Saint-Raphaël players
AC Arlésien players
US Lège Cap Ferret players
Ligue 2 players
French football managers
Sportspeople from Nord (French department)
French Romani people
Footballers from Hauts-de-France
Romani footballers